Nealeodus is a genus of conodonts which existed in what is now Canada during the middle Ordovician. It was described as a new genus for the species Lenodus martinpointensis by Svend Stouge in 2012.

References 

Conodont genera
Ordovician conodonts
Fossils of Canada
Paleontology in Newfoundland and Labrador